This is a list of domestic animal breeds originating in Scotland. To be considered domesticated, a population of animals must have their behaviour, life cycle, or physiology systemically altered as a result of being under human control for many generations.

Scotland has produced some of the longest-established domestic animal breeds. There are thirty-seven extant animal breeds from Scotland, and three that are extinct. The Soay Sheep has prehistoric origins, and the Galloway breed of beef cattle dates back several hundred years. New breeds have also been developed more recently in Scotland, such as the Scottish Fold cat, which dates from 1961.

The North Ronaldsay Sheep is a most unusual breed, subsisting largely on a diet of seaweed. The Boreray was in 2012 the only sheep breed listed by the Rare Breeds Survival Trust as 'critical', its highest level of concern at that time; in 2022 it was listed as 'at risk', the lower of the two levels of concern of the Trust. Some breeds, such as the Shetland Pony and the Border Collie are well known throughout much of the Western world, whilst others such as the Scots Dumpy chicken are little-known, even at home. Fifteen breeds of dog have Scottish origins, including six terrier breeds. Indeed, the relative isolation of many Scottish islands has led to a preponderance of breeds from these places being represented. Various breeds are now extinct, including the Grice, an archaic and somewhat aggressive pig.

Breeds

Cats

Cattle

Chickens

Dogs

Geese

Horses

Sheep

Extinct breeds 

Prior to their demise, the Paisley Terrier contributed to the bloodline of the Yorkshire Terrier and the Scottish Tan Face to the Boreray sheep. Although Galloway Ponies were praised by Gervaise Markham in the 17th century for their "fine shape, easie pace, pure metall and infinit toughness", true to form Samuel Johnson described them as "common hackneys". It shares its origins with the still extant Fell Pony. A model of the Grice, whose habit of attacking lambs cannot have aided its survival, was recreated by a taxidermist in 2006.

See also 
 Fauna of Scotland
 Shetland animal breeds
 Scottish inventions and discoveries

References

Animal breeds originating in Scotland
Scottish Breeds
Lists of biota of Scotland
Fauna of Scotland